The tetrakas and allies are a newly validated family of songbirds. They were formally named Bernieridae in 2010.  The family currently consists of eleven species (in eight genera) of small forest birds. These birds are all endemic to Madagascar.

In 1934, the monophyly of this group was proposed by Finn Salomonsen but the traditional assignments of these birds were maintained, mistaken by their convergent evolution and the lack of dedicated research. The families to which the Malagasy warblers were formerly assigned—Pycnonotidae (bulbuls) and even more so Timaliidae (Old World babblers) and the Old World warbler—were used as "wastebin taxa", uniting unrelated lineages that were somewhat similar ecologically and morphologically.

It was not until the analysis of mtDNA cytochrome b and 16S rRNA as well as nDNA RAG-1 and RAG-2 exon sequence data, that the long-proposed grouping was accepted.

Taxonomy and systematics
The family contains 11 species divided into 8 genera.

Several of these species are very poorly known and were described by science only very recently. Appert's tetraka was only described in 1972 and the cryptic warbler in 1996. The Appert's tetraka, along with the dusky tetraka are threatened by habitat loss, and are listed as vulnerable.

Most members of this family live in the humid rainforests in the east of Madagascar, though a few species are found in the drier southwest of the island. They feed on insects and will form mixed-species feeding flocks of up to six species while foraging.

References

Further reading

 Del Hoyo, J.; Elliot, A. & Christie D. (editors). (2006). Handbook of the Birds of the World. Volume 11: Old World Flycatchers to Old World Warblers. Lynx Edicions. .
Roberson, Don (2006): The break-up of the Old World warblers: A discussion of the 'new' tree. Version of 2006-06-26. Retrieved on 2007-05-12.
Salomonsen, F. (1934): Revision of the Madagascar Timaliine birds. Ann. Mag. Nat. Hist. (10th series) 14: 60–79.